The 500 Years of Christianity in the Philippines (500 YOC) is a quincentennial observed in the Philippines. It commemorates the introduction of Christianity in the Philippines in 1521 when the Magellan expedition made a stopover in the islands.

Background 

The 500 Years of Christianity in the Philippines celebrations is part of the larger 2021 Quincentennial Commemorations in the Philippines (2021 QCP) event organized by the Philippine government. The Philippine national government aims to commemorate the 500th anniversary of the Filipinos' first contact with the Spanish in 1521 from a Filipino-centric point of view in 2021. The National Quincentennial Committee (NQC) was formed for this purpose in May 2018, when President Rodrigo Duterte issued Executive Order (EO) No. 55. President Duterte issued EO 103 on January 28, 2019 formalizing the intent for the commemorations to be "Filipino-centric" and expanded the membership and scope of the NQC.

The full name of the  event commemorating the introduction of Christianity in the Philippines is "500th anniversary of the introduction of Christianity in the Philippines"

The Catholic Bishops' Conference of the Philippines (CBCP) is the lead organizer of the quincentennial of the introduction of the Christianity in the Philippines. Bishop Pablo Virgilio David representing the CBCP, reject the notion that celebrating the 500th anniversary of the introduction of the Philippines as also celebrating the Spanish colonization of the islands citing continued prevalence of the religion long after colonization and asserts that Filipino ancestors were "intelligent enough" to accept what is good and reject what is evil among the introductions made by the Spanish in the Philippines.

Despite the COVID-19 pandemic, the 2021 QCP will still be held albeit modified to comply with protocols imposed in response to the health crisis. Although about 50 projects related to the quincentennial were either canceled or indefinitely postponed.

Marketing
The Catholic Bishops' Conference of the Philippines (CBCP) adopted the event's theme and logo on September 18, 2019. The theme is "Gifted to Give" was derived from Matthew 10:8. The logo used various elements such as a cross, a ship, the sun, a rosary. The logo depicts a ship with a cross as its mast with the central figure derived from First Baptism in the Philippines painting of Fernando Amorsolo. The logo was designed by Edilberto Dionio, a theology student. The logo was designed by Edilberto Dionio, a theology student

Events

The commemoration of the introduction of Christianity in the Philippines was supposed to culminate in April 2021 but was changed to be the kickoff month of the observances due to the COVID-19 pandemic. As a result some events will be held in 2022.
 September 26, 2020 – Social media launch of the 500 Years of Christianity (YOC) event.
 January 5, 2021 – A temporary artwork made from solar-powered light bulbs will be installed encompassing the Agrifina Circle and Relief Map at the Rizal Park. The artwork made under the non-profit Liter of Light is in a form of a rosary and the bulbs will be donated after the event.
 February 25, 2021 – April 22, 2022 – Pilgrims visiting 537 sites in the Philippines designated as Jubilee Churches within period will be granted plenary indulgences by Pope Francis.
 March 14, 2021 (CET, UTC+1) – Pope Francis will preside a mass at the St. Peter's Basilica in Vatican City at 10a.m. as part of the quincentennial.
 April 14, 2021 – Commemoration of the first Christian baptisms in the Philippines. Rajah Humabon and 50 others agreed to get baptized 500 years ago. A re-enactment of the event will see 500 people with special needs get baptized.
 April 17, 2021 – Commemoration of the first Easter Sunday mass in the Philippines. The date itself also falls on a Easter Sunday, will also mark the official kickoff of the 500 Years of Christianity (YOC) event.
 August 3, 2021 – Signed two joint statements with the Philippine Independent Church (Iglesia Filipina Independiente)  "for a more ecumenical cooperation amidst diversity", with the first statement as "Celebrating the Gift of Faith, Learning from the Past, and Journeying Together" and the second as a "Mutual Recognition of Baptisms between the IFI and the RCC in the Philippines."
 April 2022 – International Mission Congress (IMC) and the 2nd National Mission Congress will be held which was postponed by a year due to the COVID-19 pandemic.

See also
Philippine Centennial
Iglesia ni Cristo Centennial
2016 International Eucharistic Congress

References

External links 
 

2021 in the Philippines
Philippine historical anniversaries
Christianity in the Philippines
Catholic Church in the Philippines
Historical events in the Philippines
History of the Philippines (1565–1898)
Presidency of Rodrigo Duterte
2021 in Christianity